Nandi Hills is a town in Nandi County, Kenya and also forms a constituency by itself. The name also refers to the general area of Nandi County, where the urban settlement is located.

Location

Nandi Hills is located in a highland area of lush green rolling hills at the edge of the Great Rift Valley in the southwestern part of Kenya. The coordinates of Nandi Hills, Kenya are:0°06'01.0"N, 35°10'35.0"E (Latitude:0.100278; Longitude:35.176389).

Overview
The small town named Nandi Hills, is often referred to as the "cradle land of Kenyan running". The area is home to many world-renowned athletes, including Kipchoge Keino, Wilson Kipketer, Janeth Jepkosgei, Augustine Choge, Wilfred Bungei, Henry Rono and Mike Boit. The area is mostly inhabited by the Nandi people. Nandi Hills has a cool and wet climate with two rain seasons during the equinoxes. Temperatures vary between 18 °C and 24 °C which coupled with the rich volcanic soils make the area ideal for growing tea. The scenic area is known for its many tea estates. There is also a golf course, Nandi Bears Club, where several annual tournaments are held annually such as the Gill Trophy, the Kenya Ladies' Golf Union and the prestigious Kenya Breweries Festival of Golf besides rally and cross countries.

It is a very significant area of Rift Valley province and the Kalenjin community. It was a battleground against the Luo and Luhya communities and the burial site of the renowned Nandi seer Koitalel Arap Samoei. He is buried under a symbolic tree. On top of Nandi Hills sits Samoei with its red earth. When Koitalel was killed by British officer Richard Meinertzhagen, some believe the ground turned red on the spot of his death.

Local economy

The economy of Nandi Hills relies mainly on surrounding tea estates. Many people work on tea farms as pluckers, managers, field maintenance, factory service works, official duties and business. Nandi Hills town has barely a tarmac street despite a lot of taxes accrued from tea farms.

Transportation
The transport system in Nandi Hills is mainly land-based via tarmac. The Nandi Hills road network connects it to major Kenyan cities including Eldoret, Nakuru, Kericho, Kisumu and, ultimately, Nairobi and Mombasa.

References

External links 
 Nandi Bears Golf Club
 The Kenyan Camper: Nandi Hills – Much More Than Tea

Mountain ranges of Kenya
Populated places in Nandi County